Old St. Nicholas Russian Orthodox Church, also known as the Eklutna Chapel, is a historic Russian Orthodox church in Eklutna, Alaska.  It is about one mile inland from the Knik Arm of the Cook Inlet.

It was moved to its current location in 1900.

A new church was built next to the old in 1962.  It was added to the National Register of Historic Places in 1972.  This and other Russian Orthodox churches of the Alaskan Diocese were studied during the National Register of Historic Places inventory and Historic American Buildings Survey.

See also
National Register of Historic Places listings in Anchorage, Alaska

References

External links

Eklutna Historical Park

19th-century establishments in Alaska
Buildings and structures on the National Register of Historic Places in Anchorage, Alaska
Churches completed in 1870
Churches on the National Register of Historic Places in Alaska
Denaʼina
Historic American Buildings Survey in Alaska
Log buildings and structures on the National Register of Historic Places in Alaska
Roadside attractions in Alaska
Russian Orthodox church buildings in Alaska